For optical fibers, a power-law index profile is an index of refraction profile characterized by 

where

Hence, this is sometimes called an alpha profile. 

For this class of profiles, multimode distortion is smallest when  takes a particular value depending on the material used. For most materials, this optimum value is approximately 2. In the limit of infinite , the profile becomes a step-index profile.

See also
Graded-index fiber

References

Fiber optics